Stein-Wingert is an Ortsgemeinde – a community belonging to a Verbandsgemeinde – in the Westerwaldkreis in Rhineland-Palatinate, Germany.

Geography

Location
The community lies in the Westerwald between Limburg and Siegen, on the river Nister in the middle of the Kroppach Switzerland (Kroppacher Schweiz). The residential community of Stein-Wingert belongs to the Verbandsgemeinde of Hachenburg, a kind of collective municipality. Its seat is in the like-named town.

Constituent communities
Stein-Wingert's Ortsteile are Wingert, Stein, Alhausen and Altburg.

History
Stein-Wingert belonged in the 12th century first to the landlords of Nister. Already by the early 13th century, the community passed to the Lords of Sayn, and in 1649/71 to Sayn-Hachenburg, with which it fell to Nassau-Weilburg in 1799. In 1806, Stein-Wingert passed to the Duchy of Nassau, and as of 1866 it was in Prussia’s province of Hesse-Nassau.

Politics

The municipal council is made up of 7 council members, including the extraofficial mayor (Bürgermeister), who were elected in a majority vote in a municipal election on 13 June 2004.

Regular events
Since 1984, every other year on the last weekend in June, the Backtrogrennen (“Dough Trough Race”) has been held. This custom imported from southern Germany consists of paddling down a stretch of the river Nister and back up again in wooden troughs. As of 2007, the festival is to be held in odd-numbered years, as it did not take place in 2006 owing to the Football World Cup.

Economy and infrastructure

South of the community runs Bundesstraße 414, leading from Altenkirchen to Hachenburg. The nearest Autobahn interchanges are in Siegen, Wilnsdorf and Herborn on the A 45 (Dortmund–Gießen). The nearest InterCityExpress stop is the railway station at Montabaur on the Cologne-Frankfurt high-speed rail line.

References

External links
 Stein-Wingert in the collective municipality’s Web pages 

Municipalities in Rhineland-Palatinate
Westerwaldkreis
Kroppach Switzerland